Corydoras osteocarus is a tropical freshwater fish belonging to the Corydoradinae sub-family of the family Callichthyidae.  It originates in South America, and is found in the Orinoco River basin in Venezuela and coastal rivers in Suriname.  In the system of "C-Numbers" developed by the German fishkeeping magazine DATZ to identify undescribed species of Corydoras in the aquarium hobby, this fish had been assigned number "C60" until it was correctly identified.

The fish will grow in length up to 1.6 inches (4.0 centimeters).  It lives in a tropical climate in water with a 6.0 – 8.0 pH, a water hardness of 2 – 25 dGH, and a temperature range of 70 – 77 °F (21 – 25 °C).  It feeds on worms, benthic crustaceans, insects, and plant matter.  It lays eggs in dense vegetation and adults do not guard the eggs.  In captivity, it produces up to 300 eggs, which it usually attaches to plants. Hatching occurs in about 3–4 days at 21.4 °C (70 °F).

See also
 List of freshwater aquarium fish species

References 
 
 

Corydoras
Taxa named by James Erwin Böhlke
Fish described in 1951